This is the list of the number-one albums of the UK Indie Breakers Chart during the 2020s.

Number-one albums

By record label
, Six record labels have spent four or more weeks at the top of the chart so far during the 2020s.

By Artist
, One artist has spent three or more weeks at the top of the chart so far during the 2020s.

See also
 Lists of UK Independent Albums Chart number ones

References

External links
Independent Albums Breakers at the Official Charts Company

2020s in British music
United Kingdom Independent Albums
Indie Breakers